Sándor Wekerle (14 November 1848 – 26 August 1921) was a Hungarian politician who served three times as prime minister. He was the first non-noble to hold the office in Hungary.

Biography

He was born in Mór to a Danube Swabian family, in the comitatus of Fejér. His mother was Antónia Szép. After studying law at the Faculty of Law of the  University of Budapest he graduated doctor juris. He then entered the government service, and after a period of probation was appointed to a post in the ministry of finance. He still, however, continued an academic career by lecturing on political economy at the university.

In 1886 Wekerle was elected to the House of Deputies, became in the same year financial secretary of state, and in 1889 succeeded Kálmán Tisza as minister of finance. He immediately addressed himself to the task of improving the financial position of the country, carried out the conversion of the state loans, and succeeded, for the first time in the history of the Hungarian budget, in avoiding a deficit.

In November 1892 Wekerle succeeded Count Gyula Szapáry as premier, though still retaining the portfolio of finance. At the head of a strong government he was enabled, in spite of a powerful opposition of Catholics and Magnates, to carry in 1894 the Civil Marriage Bill. The continued opposition of the clerical party, however, brought about his resignation on 22 December 1894, when he was succeeded by Dezső Bánffy. On 1 January 1897 he was appointed president of the newly created judicial commission at Budapest, and for the next few years held aloof from politics, even under the ex-lex government of Khuen-Héderváry. On the reconciliation of the king-emperor with the coalition he was therefore selected as the most suitable man to lead the new government, and on 8 April 1906 was appointed prime minister, taking at the same time the portfolio of finance. He resigned the premiership on 27 April 1909, but was not relieved of his office until the formation of the Khuen-Héderváry cabinet on 17 January 1910.

Wekerle returned to power in 1917, and served for the last year of the First World War. As in his 1906 to 1910 ministry, Wekerle was largely acting as a figurehead for a coalition of stronger personalities around him. Although, towards its end, the ministry began to move in the direction of an expansion of the Hungarian franchise, events, particularly the imminent military defeat of Austria-Hungary and its allies, moved too fast for it, and Wekerle resigned in October 1918.

During the time of the Hungarian Soviet Republic, Wekerle was held prisoner as a hostage.

Legacy
Wekerle died in Budapest, aged 72. In the south of Budapest, the notable Wekerle estate (Wekerletelep) neighbourhood is named after him. Built before World War II, its central square was designed by the architect Károly Kós. The neighbourhood provided affordable housing to working-class families in a green, open and familiar setting. This was an early example of a planned residential neighbourhood in Europe.

Notes

References 
 
 

1848 births
1921 deaths
People from Mór
Danube-Swabian people
Hungarian-German people
Liberal Party (Hungary) politicians
National Constitution Party politicians
Prime Ministers of Hungary
Hungarian Interior Ministers
Defence ministers of Hungary
Finance ministers of Hungary
Justice ministers of Hungary
Agriculture ministers of Hungary
Ministers of Croatian Affairs of Hungary
Budapest University alumni
Burials at Kerepesi Cemetery
Heads of government who were later imprisoned